Stanton County is a county in the U.S. state of Nebraska. As of the 2010 United States Census, the population was 6,129. Its county seat is Stanton. The county was formed in 1856 and organized in 1867. It was first called Izard County until 1862, when it was renamed for Edwin M. Stanton, Secretary of War during the administration of President Abraham Lincoln.

Stanton County is part of the Norfolk, NE Micropolitan Statistical Area.

In the Nebraska license plate system, Stanton County is represented by the prefix 53 (it had the 53rd-greatest number of vehicles registered in the county when the license plate system was established in 1922).

Geography
The terrain of Stanton County consists of low rolling hills, sloped toward the east. The Elkhorn River flows easterly through the upper central part of the county.

Major highways

  U.S. Highway 275
  Nebraska Highway 15
  Nebraska Highway 24
  Nebraska Highway 32
  Nebraska Highway 35
  Nebraska Highway 57

Adjacent counties

 Cuming County – east
 Colfax County – south
 Platte County – southwest
 Madison County – west
 Pierce County – northwest
 Wayne County – north

Protected areas

 Black Island State Wildlife Management Area (partial)
 Maskenthine Lake Recreation Area
 Red Fox State Wildlife Management Area
 Wood Duck State Wildlife Management Area

Demographics

As of the 2000 United States Census, there were 6,455 people, 2,297 households, and 1,784 families in the county. The population density was 15 people per square mile (6/km2). There were 2,452 housing units at an average density of 6 per square mile (2/km2). The racial makeup of the county was 96.72% White, 0.42% Black or African American, 0.48% Native American, 0.12% Asian, 1.38% from other races, and 0.88% from two or more races. 2.31% of the population were Hispanic or Latino of any race. 55.8% were of German, 9.7% Czech and 5.6% Irish ancestry.

There were 2,297 households, out of which 38.90% had children under the age of 18 living with them, 67.50% were married couples living together, 7.20% had a female householder with no husband present, and 22.30% were non-families. 19.20% of all households were made up of individuals, and 8.10% had someone living alone who was 65 years of age or older. The average household size was 2.76 and the average family size was 3.16.

The county population contained 29.80% under the age of 18, 7.60% from 18 to 24, 27.40% from 25 to 44, 21.80% from 45 to 64, and 13.50% who were 65 years of age or older. The median age was 36 years. For every 100 females, there were 98.40 males. For every 100 females age 18 and over, there were 96.40 males.

The median income for a household in the county was $36,676, and the median income for a family was $41,040. Males had a median income of $27,969 versus $19,428 for females. The per capita income for the county was $15,511. About 5.30% of families and 6.80% of the population were below the poverty line, including 6.80% of those under age 18 and 7.20% of those age 65 or over.

Communities

City
 Stanton (county seat)

Village
 Pilger

Census-designated place
 Woodland Park

Politics
Stanton County voters are reliably Republican. In no national election since 1936 has the county selected the Democratic Party candidate.

References

 
Norfolk Micropolitan Statistical Area
1867 establishments in Nebraska
Populated places established in 1867